The Paulo César Vinha State Park is a state park in the state of Espírito Santo, Brazil.
It protects an area of dunes, lagoons and marshes along the Atlantic shore.

Location

The Paulo César Vinha State Park is in the municipality of Guarapari, Espírito Santo.
There is a visitor center where videos and slides of the park are shown and lectures given on environmental education.
The park is surrounded by the Setiba Environmental Protection Area, which acts as a buffer zone and also tries to protect the marine environment of the Três Ilhas Archipelago.

The park has two beaches, the Sol and the Caraís.
There are several islands and rocks offshore.
The park contains diverse environments including lagoons, sand dunes and floodplains.
The Caraís Lagoon is its main attraction.
The lagoon has reddish water from the plant roots.
Vegetation includes dry forest, permanently flooded forest, herbaceous marsh and open formations.
Threatened species include the pimenteira rosa and ouriço preto.

History

The park was created by state decree 2993-N of 1990, with the original name of Setiba State Park.
The purpose is to protect a continuous stretch of restinga, one of the most threatened of the Atlantic Forest ecosystems.
By law 4.903 of 1994 it was renamed Paulo César Vinha State Park in honor of the biologist Paulo César Vinha, who was killed in 1993 for opposing sand mining in the region.
It became part of the Central Atlantic Forest Ecological Corridor, created in 2002.

Notes

Sources

State parks of Brazil
Protected areas of Espírito Santo
1990 establishments in Brazil
Protected areas established in 1990